Paranopleta is a genus of beetles belonging to the family Staphylinidae.

The species of this genus are found in Northern Europe.

Species:
 Paranopleta inhabilis (Kraatz, 1856)

References

Staphylinidae
Staphylinidae genera